Digimon World Championship (デジモンチャンピオンシップ Dejimon Chanpionshippu, lit. Digimon Championship) is a life simulation video game for the Nintendo DS developed by Epics and published by Bandai Namco Games as part of the Digimon franchise. It was released in Japan in February 2008 and North America in August 2008. In-contrast to its localized title in North America, the game is not part of the Digimon World sub-series of role-playing games.

Gameplay

Digimon World Championship is a simulation title which focuses singularly on the virtual pet raising, caretaking, training, and battling with no RPG or world exploration elements. It varies from other Digimon games released on Nintendo DS in that the player does not give commands in a fight but the Digimon choose their attacks themselves. It also requires that the player feeds and looks after their Digimon, also having to heal, cure, and clean up after them, much like the older Digimon games. This is also the first Digimon game to include the Dracomon line of Digimon, featuring Petitmon, Babydmon, Dracomon, Coredramon (Air), Coredramon (Ground), Wingdramon, Groundramon, Slayerdramon, and Breakdramon. The starting Digimon is Botamon.

Reception

IGN staff writer Lucas M. Thomas listed the game as one of the "tears" on his "Cheers & Tears" list of DS fighting games. He bemoaned the confusing nature of the Digivolution mechanic, adding that the Pokémon series offered a more straightforward approach to evolution.

References

External links
 Digimon World Championship Hands-On

2008 video games
Bandai Namco games
Nintendo DS games
Nintendo DS-only games
Digimon video games
Video games developed in Japan
Life simulation games